The canton of Perros-Guirec is an administrative division of the Côtes-d'Armor department, northwestern France. Its borders were not modified at the French canton reorganisation which came into effect in March 2015. Its seat is in Perros-Guirec.

It consists of the following communes:
 
Kermaria-Sulard
Louannec
Perros-Guirec
Pleumeur-Bodou
Saint-Quay-Perros
Trébeurden
Trégastel
Trélévern
Trévou-Tréguignec

References

Cantons of Côtes-d'Armor